Albert Freeman can refer to:

 Albert Freeman (cricketer, born 1844) (1844–1920), English cricketer
 Albert Freeman (cricketer, born 1887) (1887–1945), English cricketer
 Albert Freeman (footballer) (1899–?), an English footballer
 Al Freeman Jr. (1934–2012), American actor
 Bert Freeman (1885–1995), English footballer